Buddhist feminism is a movement that seeks to improve the religious, legal, and social status of women within Buddhism. It is an aspect of feminist theology which seeks to advance and understand the equality of men and women morally, socially, spiritually, and in leadership from a Buddhist perspective. The Buddhist feminist Rita Gross describes Buddhist feminism as "the radical practice of the co-humanity of women and men."

Buddhist Feminism as a Recent Understanding
Parallels between Buddhism and Feminist understanding of equality between race, gender, class, sexuality and nationality have only recently begun to be explored. Buddhism's belief of understanding the truth of reality through practicing spiritual development.
is beneficial to feminist theory, especially in comparison to other religions. 
These parallels are undergoing evaluation as religious understandings of feminism become increasingly scrutinized in society and popular discourse.

Ordination
Some Buddhist feminists advocate for the ordination of women in Buddhism. The ordination of women in Buddhism is and has always been practiced in some Buddhist regions, such as East Asia; is being revived in some countries such as Sri Lanka; and is newly beginning in some Western countries to which Buddhism has recently spread, such as the United States.

Criticisms
Jean Byrne argues that within this beginning of Buddhist Feminist understanding an ignorance of the reality of female and male roles may exist. Within her paper "Why I Am Not a Buddhist Feminist" she outlines the similarities shared between the two, and the possible increase in equality of genders, but highlights that because of this some misogynist and discriminatory aspects of Buddhism may be overlooked. The belief that Buddhism is a completely egalitarian religion concerns Byrne that this will overshadow some of the realities of Feminism in Buddhism. Postcolonial critics have noted the presence of more than one version of Buddhist feminism, critiquing, for example, the work of white liberal feminists like Rita Gross for presenting a myopic, universalist Buddhist feminism rooted in assumptions of white authority. In the process, the voices of non-white Buddhist feminists who may not fit the liberal mode of discourse are excluded and discounted.

See also
 Ordination of women in Buddhism
 Sakyadhita International Association of Buddhist Women
 Women in Buddhism
 Ānanda

References

External links
Acting with Compassion: Buddhism, Feminism, and the Environmental Crisis
Feminism and Buddhism: A Reflection through Personal Life & Working Experience
Mothering: Moral Cultivation in Buddhist and Feminist Ethics

Further reading
Gross, Rita M. Buddhism After Patriarchy: A Feminist History, Analysis, and Reconstruction of Buddhism, State University of New York Press, 1992.
Gross, Rita M. Religious Feminism and the Future of the Planet: A Buddhist-Christian Conversation, Continuum Intl Pub Group, 2001.
Klein, Anne C. Meeting the Great Bliss Queen: Buddhists, Feminists, and the Art of the Self, Snow Lion Publications, 2008.
Hu, Hsiao-Lan. This-Worldly Nibbana: A Buddhist-Feminist Social Ethic for Peacemaking in the Global Community, State University of New York Press, 2011.